Papa Doo Run Run is a band from Cupertino, California, United States, that specializes in covers of songs from the heyday of surf music in the 1960s.

History
Papa Doo Run Run (PDRR) was founded in 1965, as The Zu, then changed their name to Goodie Two Shoes, and is made up of current and former members of the Beach Boys, Jan & Dean's, Frankie Valli's and Brian Wilson's bands.

The founding members of the group were Don Zirilli (Hammond B3 Organ/keyboards), Jim Rush (bass), Jim Shippey (drums) and Steve Dromensk (guitar, primary vocals and front man) who adopted the moniker of Stevie Surf.  For years they went by the name Papa Do Run Da Run before shortening it to the name they are known by now.

In 1973, the Papa Doo boys met and got to be friends with Dean Torrence (Jan & Dean).  Torrence occasionally came to Papa's concerts and sat in with the band, adding some credibility to their act.  By 1975, Stevie Surf, wanting to go in a more comedic direction, left the band to form a musical comedy act.  Two new guitar player / vocalists, Mark Ward, and Jim Armstrong joined to replace Surf.  The "rookies", as they were called, brought a new youthful energy to the group, that was evidenced after their first concert together, on July 4, 1975, in Palm Springs, California.  That concert was followed by a series of shows at cheerleader camps throughout California.

Papa Doo Run Run is known for their award-winning re-creation of the hits of the Beach Boys and Jan & Dean.  They toured North America as the opening act and back-up band for Jan & Dean between 1976 and 1980. They were also featured as the back-up band for Jan & Dean in the 1978 CBS biopic Deadman's Curve, which had a soundtrack album featuring Papa Doo Run Run. In 1981, they moved from Jan & Dean to an association with the Beach Boys, and performed and recorded with members of that band for the following two decades.  The group also had a 15-year engagement as the “Celebrity House Band” at Disneyland in California beginning in 1975.

Papa Doo Run Run still averages nearly 100 dates a year worldwide, with two founding members, Zirilli and Rush (Jim Rush died in January, 2018). The band has produced ten albums and a full-length live show DVD, plus another seven singles and two EPs.  In 2007, Papa Doo Run Run was inducted into the North California Rock & Roll Hall of Fame.  They were elected into their hometown, San Jose Rocks Hall of Fame in 2007.

Their first major record release, "Be True to Your School" (RCA, 1975), was produced by Bruce Johnston of the Beach Boys.  It allegedly reached number 1 in California. Their CD, California Project (Telarc, 1985) peaked on the Billboard Compact Disc chart at #22, earning the band their second Gold record and a Grammy Award nomination.

Discography

Albums
1979: Deadman's Curve (soundtrack from the movie)
1983: Papa Doo Run Run (EP) 
1985: California Project
1995: It's Alive
2000: Archeology XXXV
2001: Santa Cruz
2002: Blue Plate Special
2003: P6 (EP)
2004: On the Beach
2005: America's Music - California's Band
2007: Soundtrack 40+6
2008: Greenifornia

Singles 
1966: "L.S.D. (Love Sounds Different)"
1968: "I've Got to Make It"
1972: "Sunshine Music"
1975: "Be True to Your School"
1981: "Lady Love"
1982: "California"
1983: "Tryin' to Keep the Summer Alive"

Other releases
2005: "The Christmas Song (Chestnuts Roasting...)" (web)
2006: 40th Anniversary DVD (live concert)
2006: "We Wish You a Merry Christmas" (web)
2008: "Christmas Medley" (web)
2009: "Jingle Bell Rock" (web)

Members
Current (2019) members include Don Zirilli, original member since 1965(keyboards/vocals), Donny Goldberg (replaced Jim Rush, who died in 2018, on bass/vocals), Denny Hardwick (guitar/vocals), Bo Fox (drums/vocals), Bobby Gothar (guitar/vocals), and Adrian Baker (guitar/vocals).

Former members include founding members Jim Shippey, Steve Dromensk (1946-2010), Mark Ward, Jim Armstrong, Steve Barone, Andy Parker, Dan "the man" McNamara, Jeffrey Foskett and Randell Kirsch.

Many notable surf performers have frequently sat in with Papa Doo Run Run, most notably Dean Torrence leading to his public reunion with Jan Berry (Jan and Dean), the Beach Boys; Brian Wilson, Carl Wilson, Mike Love and Bruce Johnston, plus frequent celebrity drummer John Stamos.

Jim Rush died due to esophageal cancer in January, 2018.  His duties on bass guitar were taken over by Donny Goldberg.

Jeffrey Foskett, who would periodically join Papa on rhythm guitar and vocals has more recently been Brian Wilson’s musical director and currently is a member of The Beach Boys’ touring band.

References

External links
 Papadoo.com - official website

Surf music groups
Musical groups from California
Musical groups established in 1965